Manisa Büyükşehir Belediyespor, is a Turkish professional basketball club based in Manisa. As of the 2022–23 season, the team competes in the Turkish Basketbol Süper Ligi. The team plays its matches in Muradiye Sports Hall.

Current roster

Honours
Turkish Basketball First League
Winner (1): 2021–22.

References

External links 
Official Page
Official Page in Turkish Basketball Federation website 
Official Twitter Page

Basketball teams in Turkey
Basketball teams established in 1994